This is a guide to the size of the wards in North Warwickshire based on the data from the 2001 UK Census. The entire population of the borough was 61,860.

N.B. Ward populations will differ from the village population which they are named after and which they are linked to as ward boundaries very rarely match village boundaries exactly.

List of wards in North Warwickshire by population
North Warwickshire, wards
North